The men's heptathlon at the 2018 IAAF World Indoor Championships took place on 2 and 3 March 2018.

Summary
With the retirement of defending champion Ashton Eaton, the multi event world opened up.  2016 Olympic silver medalist Kévin Mayer assumed the top spot winning the 2017 World Championships.  His pursuers included Olympic bronze medalist Damian Warner and world championship bronze medalist Kai Kazmirek.

In the 60 metres, Warner ran the top time of 6.74, his personal best, but Mayer was only .11 behind, also running his personal best, putting Warner 41 points ahead. In the long jump, Kazmirek boomed a  personal best to offset one of the poorer 60 metre times to move into a tight group fighting for third place. Oleksiy Kasyanov actually held an 8 point advantage in third, with Dominik Distelberger joining the other two within 13 points of each other. At the top of the leader board, Mayer had another personal best of 7.55m in the long jump to pull within two points of Warner. In the shot put, Mayer overpowered Warner, his  more than 2 feet further than Warner, who threw his personal best 14.90m. Mayer had a 45 point lead. Kazmirek's personal best 14.55m shot put put him 16 points up for third place. As the last event of the first day, Mayer and Warner topped out at 2.02m, with Kazmirek gaining a little ground with a 2.05m. At that height, Maicel Uibo had barely warmed up.

Warner began the second day with a 7.67 60 metres hurdles, .16 better than Mayer and enough to pull him back to 4 points behind. Both Kazmirek and Uibo ran personal bests, but Kazmirek was .24 better to give him a 45 point advantage. Kasyanov pushed over a hurdle to take himself out of the race. In the pole vault, Warner got over a personal best 4.90m to only lose 10 cm and another 30 points to Mayer. But Kazmirek had also jumped a personal best 5.20m, so Uibo was still 13 points behind. In order to win the championship, Warner needed to beat Mayer by about 3 seconds in the 1000 meters, and Uibo needed to beat Kazmirek by about 1.3 seconds. Both Warner 2:37.12 and Uibo 2:38.51 ran personal bests in first and second place. Mayer was able to stay about 2 and a half seconds behind Warner to take the championship by a scant 5 points. Uibo beat Kazmirek by over 3 and a half seconds to take the bronze. Warner was able to beat Mike Smith's 25 year old Canadian national record.

Detailed results

60 metres
The 60 metres was held on 2 March at 09:59.

Long jump
The long jump was held on 2 March at 10:40.

Shot put
The shot put was held on 2 March at 11:59.

High jump
The high jump was held on 2 March at 19:44.

60 metres hurdles
The 60 metres hurdles was held on 3 March at 09:59.

Pole vault
Pole vault was held on 3 March at 11:07.

1000 metres

The 1000 metres was held on 3 March at 19:50.

Overall results
After all events.

Key

References

Heptathlon
Combined events at the World Athletics Indoor Championships
2018 in men's athletics